Parks College of Engineering, Aviation and Technology is a college within Saint Louis University.

History

Founding
Parks Air College was founded by Oliver Parks in the city of East Saint Louis Il in the year of 1927.  Parks was America's first federally certified school of aviation, holding the FAA Air Agency Certificate no. 1. Oliver Parks started as the sole flight instructor with two instruction aircraft at Lambert airfield. The venture nearly ended when Parks crashed a Laird Swallow training aircraft leaving only one remaining trainer and was unable to teach lessons while in the hospital. He bought 100 acres in East St. Louis in 1928, and built five buildings the same year. By 1929 Parks operated 35 Travel Air trainers with an enrollment of 600 students.

Parks College was initially a publicly traded company. During the great depression, the Detroit Aircraft Corporation bought up eighty percent of the stock as part of a large merger of aviation entities. Oliver Parks sold most of his assets to buy back a controlling interest. The college students manufactured their own series of biplane aircraft, including the Parks P-2A, which became the "hero" of books by author Richard Bach. The college quickly got out of the manufacturing business, selling the P2A rights to Ryan as the Ryan Speedster, and later the Hammond 100.

In 1931 Parks offered an Executive Transport Pilot's course. In the 1930s those enrolled as aeronautical engineers, had to design, construct and test fly their own aircraft.  By 1936 the enrollment reached 200 students, with a training fleet that consisted of 49 aircraft including the Kinner Sportster and Lambert Twin Monocoach.

Wartime Training
In 1938 Oliver Parks, (representing Parks Air College,) Curtis-Wright Technical Institute, and Boeing School of Aeronautics were requested by Gen Arnold to establish, at their own risk, a Civilian Pilot Training Program including barracks and aircraft to provide basic training for thousands of pilots.  As enrollment swelled, Parks further expanded his facilities to include operations at Cape Girardeau and Sikeston, Missouri, Tuscaloosa, Alabama, and Jackson, Mississippi.  Parks College trained thousands of aviators and aircraft mechanics during World War II.  By the end of the war, more than 37,000 cadets (more than 10% of the Air Corps) had received their primary flight instruction at a Parks institution. A variety of training aircraft were used including PT-13, PT-17, PT-19, and the locally built PT-15 trainers.

In 1935 Parks College started Parks College Airline, a student run airline on a single routes between the college and Chicago, Memphis, Indianapolis and Kansas City.  The airline operated into the 1950s flying Cessna T-50 Bamboo Bombers.

In 1944 Parks started a training curriculum to train female pilots.  The students flew in ERCO Ercoupes with two-control flight systems.

Merger with Saint Louis University
Following the rapid decline in wartime training, Parks concluded that future aviation leaders would need a broader, more academic education. Parks donated the college valued at $3 million to Saint Louis University in 1946, remembering the Jesuit help he received after his 1928 air crash.

Wernher von Braun donated a V-2 rocket engine from the White Sands Missile Range to the college after a visit in the 1950s.

By the late 1990s Parks campus expanded to 18 buildings, including a Mach 4 windtunnel. The training fleet consisted of Cessna 152, Mooney 201 and Cessna 310 models. Women in Aviation, International founder Dr. Peggy Baty joined Parks College serving from 1990 to 1995.

Campus consolidation

In 1996, Saint Louis University closed the historic Cahokia, Illinois campus and later sold it to the village. Classes are now held in the new McDonnell-Douglas Hall building on the Frost Campus in mid-town St Louis.  Flight training remained at St. Louis Downtown Airport.  The move to the Frost campus allowed the curriculum to be expanded and Masters programs to be added.  The college also provides many science classes for the main campus.

Parks today

Now known as Parks College of Engineering, Aviation, and Technology, it is a modern, growing, active part of the university. In 2008, the FAA granted the college $2.25 million to form the Center for Aviation Safety Research. The center is focused on Safety Management Systems, Safety Culture, Maintenance Aviation Safety Programs, Next Generation Safety Assessment, Incident Investigation, Multi-Risk Analysis, and Next-Generation Maintenance and Engineering.

In November 2013, Parks engineering students launched COPPER from the Wallops Flight Facility. The microsatellite will be controlled from the St. Louis campus for a period of a year.

Departments
 Aerospace & Mechanical Engineering
 Aviation Science
 Biomedical Engineering
 Electrical & Computer Engineering
 Civil Engineering
 Interdisciplinary Engineering
 Physics

Alumni
 Francis Gabreski – World War II Ace that received primary training at Parks.
 Gene Kranz – NASA Flight Director.
 Earl T. Ricks – United States Air Force Major General, Director of the Air National Guard and Mayor of Hot Springs, Arkansas
 Jeffrey Standerski - a senior vice president at Rockwell Collins, a major aerospace company
 Harrison Thyng – Multiple World War II and Korean War ace.
 Richard G. Thomas – Aeronautical Engineering, Northrop test pilot, Tacit Blue/Area 51; F-5 spin tests-Edwards Air Force Base, Calif., Boeing Aircraft Company, Wichita, KS.
 Ray Shahifar – CFO at New tech Aircraft Services

Honorary degrees
 Wernher von Braun
 Gerald P. Carr – NASA Skylab 4 Commander.

References

External links
Parks College of Engineering, Aviation and Technology (Official website)

Saint Louis University
Aviation schools in the United States
Engineering universities and colleges in Missouri
Educational institutions established in 1927
Catholic engineering schools and colleges in the United States
1927 establishments in Missouri